A termite is an insect.

Termite may also refer to:
 Brother Termite, a novel by Patricia Anthony
 Termites from Mars, an animated cartoon
 The Termites, a UK pop group who in 1965 released a cover of The Rolling Stones' song Tell Me
 Termites (Τερμίτες), a Greek progressive rock group, originally named P.L.J. Band, composed of Antonis Mitzelos, Lavrentis Machairitsas, Pavlos Kikrilis and Dimitri Vassilakis
 The Termites, a psychobilly five-piece band from Scotland formed in 1985
 A nickname for the participants in Lewis Terman's study of gifted children
 termite, a deprecated terminal emulator

See also
Termit (disambiguation)
Thermite , a mixture of metal and metal oxide powders.